Masdevallia ventricularia is a species of orchid occurring from Colombia to northwestern Ecuador.

References

External links 

ventricularia
Orchids of Colombia
Orchids of Ecuador